Velina Konstantinova Koshuleva (born 1 February 1991) is a Bulgarian footballer who plays as a forward for Women's National Championship club FC NSA Sofia and the Bulgaria women's national team.

International career
Koshuleva capped most recently for Bulgaria at senior level in a 0–6 friendly loss to Croatia on 14 June 2019.

References

1991 births
Living people
Bulgarian women's footballers
Women's association football forwards
FC NSA Sofia players
Bulgaria women's international footballers
21st-century Bulgarian women